Perfect World was a hard rock band featuring vocalist Kelly Hansen (ex-Hurricane and Unruly Child and current Foreigner), bassist Fabrizio V.Zee Grossi, guitarist Alex De Rosso, guitarist JM Scattolin, drummer Biggs Brice and pianist Adam Forgione.

Perfect World released a self-titled album that was released in 2003 on the Frontiers Records label.

Discography

Studio albums

Band members
The band consisted of the following members
 Kelly Hansen – lead vocals
 Fabrizio V.Zee Grossi – bass guitar, keyboards
 Alex De Rosso – lead guitar
 JM Scattolin – acoustic guitar, electric guitar
 Biggs Brice – drums
 Adam Forgione – Piano

American hard rock musical groups